David Neal is the Independent Chief Inspector of Borders and Immigration and a retired Royal Military Police officer. He was appointed by the Home Secretary, Priti Patel, in succession to David Bolt who left the post in March 2021.

Military career
David Neal graduated from Bangor University with a BA in English Literature in 1993. He attended the Royal Military Academy Sandhurst on Commissioning Course 933 and was commissioned into the Royal Military Police on 20 September 1994.

After service on exercise and operations across the world, on 22 July 2016, he was appointed by The Queen as the Provost Marshal (Army) and Commander of 1 Military Police Brigade in the rank of Brigadier.

He accepted the Freedom of the City of Salisbury on behalf of the Royal Military Police on 14 June 2018. This freedom was exercised by the Royal Military Police at Armed Forces Day on 29 June 2019.

Blackstone Consultancy 
After leaving the Army he was employed by London-based Blackstone Consultancy as Strategic Security Advisor He was a finalist in the UK Outstanding Security Performance Awards (OSPAs) 2021 nominated as Outstanding Security Consultant.

Independent Chief Inspector of Borders and Immigration (ICIBI) 
David Neal is the third individual appointed to the post of Independent Chief Inspector of Borders and Immigration. The ICIBI is an independent monitoring body that reports on the efficiency and effectiveness of the immigration, asylum, nationality and customs functions carried out by the Home Secretary, officials and others on her behalf.

Neal gave evidence to the Home Affairs Select Committee in June 2022, where it was revealed that he had not met Home Secretary Priti Patel since his appointment in March 2021.

In July 2022 the Home Office published a delayed report produced by Neal into small boats crossings the Channel which was highly critical of the Home Office's performance and response.

On 24 October 2022, Neal again gave evidence to the Home Affairs Select Committee which exposed serious overcrowding at Manston processing centre, conditions which Neal described as "wretched". This evidence prompted an urgent question in the House of Commons from the Chair of the Home Affairs Select Committee, Dame Diana Johnson MP, on 26 October 2022. A second urgent question on the same subject was tabled by Sir Roger Gale MP on 7 November 2022.

References 

Living people
Place of birth missing (living people)
Royal Military Police officers
United Kingdom border control
Alumni of Bangor University
1969 births
British Army brigadiers